Baker is a former  unincorporated community in Kern County, California.

A post office operated at Baker for a time around 1954.

If the county is not specified, it would normally be taken to mean the town of Baker in San Bernardino County, approximately  towards the east.

References

Populated places in the Mojave Desert
Unincorporated communities in Kern County, California
Unincorporated communities in California